Otakar Janecký (born 26 December 1960 in Pardubice, Czechoslovakia) is a retired Czech ice hockey forward.

Career
In his homeland Janecký represented HC Pardubice, his birthcity team for his entire Czechoslovak Extraliga and Czech Extraliga career.

Janecký represented Jokerit in the Finnish SM-liiga for several seasons, and his number, 91, has been retired by Jokerit. Janecký also played SM-liiga for SaiPa and Blues.

He played on the 1992 Olympic bronze medal-winning team from Czechoslovakia.

Otakar Janecký is Jokerit's all-time leader in assists, second in points and all-time playoffs leader in points and assists.

Family
Janecký's son, Otakar jr played ice hockey in Finnish Mestis team Jokipojat.

Career statistics

Regular season and playoffs

International

Awards
 Jari Kurri trophy for best player during the playoffs - 1997

References 

1960 births
Living people
Czech ice hockey centres
Czechoslovak ice hockey centres
Espoo Blues players
HC Dynamo Pardubice players
Ice hockey players at the 1992 Winter Olympics
Ice hockey players at the 1994 Winter Olympics
Ice hockey players with retired numbers
Jokerit players
Olympic bronze medalists for Czechoslovakia
Olympic ice hockey players of Czechoslovakia
Olympic ice hockey players of the Czech Republic
Olympic medalists in ice hockey
Sportspeople from Pardubice
Medalists at the 1992 Winter Olympics
Czechoslovak expatriate sportspeople in Finland
Czechoslovak expatriate ice hockey people
Czech expatriate ice hockey players in Finland